Ramal da Alfândega was an Iberian gauge railway line which connected Porto-Campanhã railway station to Porto-Alfândega railway station, in Porto, Portugal. It was opened in 1888 and closed in 1989.

See also 
 List of railway lines in Portugal
 List of Portuguese locomotives and railcars
 History of rail transport in Portugal

References

Alf
Railway lines opened in 1888
Railway lines closed in 1989
Iberian gauge railways